Ramabang is a  mountain in the Himalayas, in the Lahaul and Spiti district of Himachal Pradesh, India.

It was first climbed and named in June 2008 by a team of Irish climbers, members of the Irish Mountaineering Club. The first-ascent route was via the south-west ridge, about AD grade.

References

External links
 irishmountaineeringclub.org - Report from Gerry Galligan
 mountaineering.ie - Report from Darach Ó Murchú

Mountains of Himachal Pradesh
Geography of Lahaul and Spiti district